Hipora is a waterproof and breathable fabric, used as insert in winter, motorcycle and cycling gloves. It is developed by the Korean company Kolon Industries.

Design
Hipora consists of a three-layer microporous silicon coating structure. Some types are impregnated with microscopic aluminum flakes to enhance heat retention characteristics.

The first layer prevents water from passing through. The pores are less than .5 μm in diameter.

The second layer is a honeycomb structure that lets moisture in to let it expel through the first layer.

The third layer is very dense for added protection against water. This is the layer closest to the skin.

This technology meets OSHA Bloodborne Pathogens Standard (29CFR 1910.1030).

See also
Gore-Tex

References

Technical fabrics